The Wrecker is a 1933 American Pre-Code action-romance film directed by Albert S. Rogell and starring Jack Holt, Genevieve Tobin and George E. Stone. The screenplay was by Jo Swerling. The film was produced and released by Columbia Pictures.

Cast
Jack Holt as Chuck Regan
Genevieve Tobin as Mary Wilson
George E. Stone as Sam Shapiro
Sidney Blackmer as Tom Cummings
Ward Bond as Cramer
Irene White as Sarah
Russell Waddle as Chuck Regan, Jr.
Wally Albright - Chuck Regan, Jr.
P. H. Levy as Hyam
Edward LeSaint as Doctor
Clarence Muse as Chauffeur

Critical reception
A contemporary review in Variety described the film as an "old-fashioned melodrama" that is "clumsily staged," with a "[s]tory [that] follows the lines of least resistance and the direction is loose," with the result being "suspense throughout is light, mostly puffing up suddenly and petering out as rapidly in the following sequence." With respect to the acting, the review notes "Holt's standard characterization," Tobin's and Blackmer's "perfunctory performances," and that "Stone's interpretation of the junk man is all right, but much of the dialog given him is not."

Preservation status
 A print is held by the Library of Congress Packard Campus for Audio-Visual Conservation.

References

External links

1933 films
American action films
American romantic drama films
1933 romantic drama films
American black-and-white films
Columbia Pictures films
1930s English-language films
Films directed by Albert S. Rogell
Films with screenplays by Jo Swerling
1930s American films